Acústico MTV is a CD/DVD by Brazilian recording artist Cássia Eller, produced by Nando Reis and Luiz Brasil. It was recorded on March 7 and 8 of 2001 in São Paulo and released the same year. The project included guest appearances from Nando Reis, A Nação Zumbi and the rapper Xis. Acústico MTV is the Brazilian version of MTV Unplugged.

Overview
Acústico MTV is Eller's final album before her death on December 29, 2001. The album consists of seventeen songs from various authors, such as Nando Reis, Renato Russo, Cazuza, John Lennon and Paul McCartney, among others.

For the recording of the album, the entire team met for three weeks at the São José farm.

The album opener is a cover of "Non, je ne regrette rien", by Édith Piaf, a song suggested by Reis. Initially, he had thought of having Eller cover Janis Joplin, but he thought the American singer was too obvious a choice and recalled his times listening to Piaf with his mother, when she was still alive. During the sessions, he began questioning if the song was a good idea and a furious lightning hit the farm, followed by a tremendous thunder. Reis saw that as a message from his late mother encouraging him to stick to the idea.

In "Relicário", there's a guitar line that co-producer Luiz Brasil associates with the Brazilian National Anthem, but that Reis had actually created having "In the Light", by  Led Zeppelin, in mind. The song "De Esquina" was suggested by his son Theo, who was a fan of Brazilian hip hop.

Reception 
The album won the Latin Grammy for Best Brazilian Rock Album in 2002. It was one of the top twenty best-selling albums in Brazil in 2002.

Tracklisting 
 "Non, Je Ne Regrette Rien" (Michel Vaucaire / Charles Dumont)
 "Malandragem" (Cazuza / Frejat)
 "E.C.T." (Nando Reis / Marisa Monte / Carlinhos Brown)
 "Vá Morar Com O Diabo" (Riachão)
 "Partido Alto" (Chico Buarque)
 "1º De Julho" (Renato Russo)
 "Luz Dos Olhos" (Nando Reis)
 "Todo Amor Que Houver Nessa Vida" (Cazuza / Frejat)
 "Queremos Saber" (Gilberto Gil)
 "Por Enquanto" (Renato Russo)
 "Relicário" (Nando Reis)
 "O Segundo Sol" (Nando Reis)
 "Nós" (Tião Carvalho)
 "Sgt. Pepper's Lonely Hearts Club Band" (John Lennon / Paul McCartney)
 "De Esquina" (Xis)
 "Quando A Maré Encher" (Fábio Trummer / Roger Man / Bernardo Chopinho)
 "Top Top" (Os Mutantes / Arnolpho Lima Filho)

Personnel

Musicians

Guest Appearances
Nando Reis (Track 11)
Xis (Track 15)
Nação Zumbi (Track 15 and 16)

Universal Music Team

Video Team

MTV Team

References 

Cássia Eller albums
Live albums by Brazilian artists
2001 live albums
MTV Unplugged albums
Latin Grammy Award for Best Portuguese Language Rock or Alternative Album